Highest Attendance

The 2013 Boston Breakers season, is the club's eighth overall year of existence, fourth consecutive year, and first year as a member of the National Women's Soccer League.

Background 
The foundation of the league was announced on November 21, 2012, with Boston selected as a host for one of the eight teams.

Lisa Cole was announced as the head coach on December 7, 2012 returning after leading the Breakers during a successful run in the Women's Premier Soccer League Elite the previous year.

Club

Executive staff

Coaching staff

Roster

Competitions

Key

Regular season

April

May

June

July

August

Standings

Results summary

Results by round

Squad statistics
Key to positions: FW – Forward, MF – Midfielder, DF – Defender, GK – Goalkeeper

Note: jersey numbers were reassigned during the season, when a player left and another joined

See also 
 2013 National Women's Soccer League season
 2013 in American soccer

References 

2013 National Women's Soccer League season
American soccer clubs 2013 season
Boston Breakers seasons
2013 in sports in Massachusetts